This is a list of schools in Yantian District, Shenzhen.

Shenzhen municipal schools
Schools operated by the Shenzhen municipal government in Yantian District include:
Shenzhen Foreign Languages School Senior High School Division

Yantian district schools

Secondary schools

 Shenzhen Tiandong Middle School (深圳市田东中学) - Shatoujiao
 Shenzhen Yangang Middle School (深圳市盐港中学)
 Shenzhen Yantian Senior High School (深圳市盐田高级中学)
 Shenzhen Yantian Foreign Language School (深圳市盐田区外国语学校) - Dameisha
 Yantian Experimental School (盐田区实验学校)
 Yunhai School of Yanshan District (深圳市盐田区云海学校) - Yantian Subdistrict

Nine-year schools
 Shenzhen Yantian Yunhai School (深圳市盐田区云海学校) - Yantian Sub-district

Primary schools

 Linyuan Primary School in Yantian District (盐田区林园小学)
 Yantian Foreign Language Primary School (盐田区外国语小学) - Shatoujiao Subdistrict
 Yantian Foreign Language Primary School Donghe Branch (盐田区外国语小学东和分校) - Shatoujiao Subdistrict
 Yantian Gengzi Shouyi Zhongshan Memorial School (盐田区庚子首义中山纪念学校)
 Yantian Haitao Primary School (盐田区海涛小学)
 Yantian Lequn Experimental Primary School (盐田区乐群实验小学)
 Yantian Meisha Future School (盐田区梅沙未来学校) - Dameisha Subdistrict 
 Yantian Tiandong Primary School (盐田区田东小学) - Shatoujiao Subistrict
 Yantian Tianxin Primary School (盐田区田心小学) - Shatoujiao Subdistrict
 Yantian Yangang Primary School (盐田区盐港小学)

Notes

References

Yantian
Yantian District